Cristiano Gimelli (born 15 February 1982) is an Italian football defender.

Gimelli played at Serie D clubs at Rome. In September 2004, he signed a 5-year contract with Lazio. He went on loan to Casale, Viterbese of Serie C2, before joined Lanciano in co-ownership deal. In June 2007, he returned to Lazio, but went on loan to Serie D club F.C. Rieti in mid-2007, Flaminia Civita Castellana in mid-2008 and Civitavecchia in September 2008.

External links

Italian footballers
S.S. Lazio players
S.S. Virtus Lanciano 1924 players
Association football defenders
Footballers from Rome
1982 births
Living people
A.S.D. Civitavecchia 1920 players